MTV Studios may refer to:

MTV Studios, the former name of the broadcast studios of ViacomCBS Domestic Media Networks located in One Astor Plaza.
MTV Entertainment Studios, formerly known as MTV Studios, the production division of MTV